Alvin C. Reis (March 24, 1892January 24, 1956) was an American lawyer, politician, and judge.  He was a Wisconsin Circuit Court Judge for the last 20 years of his life. Earlier in his career, he was a member of the Wisconsin State Assembly and the Wisconsin State Senate, and served as a United States Army officer in World War I.

Biography
Reis was born on March 24, 1892, in Evansville, Indiana. He graduated from the University of Wisconsin-Madison and Harvard Law School. During World War II, he served as a major in the United States Army. Battles Reis took part in include the Battle of Château-Thierry, the Battle of Saint-Mihiel and the Meuse-Argonne Offensive. He died on January 24, 1956, in Madison, Wisconsin, and is buried at Forest Hill Cemetery.

Political career
Reis was elected to the Assembly in 1926 and 1928 and to the Senate in 1932. Later, he became a judge on the Wisconsin Circuit Court. He was a Republican.

Electoral history

Wisconsin Assembly (1926, 1928)

| colspan="6" style="text-align:center;background-color: #e9e9e9;"| General Election, November 2, 1926

Wisconsin Attorney General (1930)

| colspan="6" style="text-align:center;background-color: #e9e9e9;"| General Election, April 1930

| colspan="6" style="text-align:center;background-color: #e9e9e9;"| General Election, November 4, 1930

Wisconsin Senate (1932)

| colspan="6" style="text-align:center;background-color: #e9e9e9;"| Primary Election, September 1932

| colspan="6" style="text-align:center;background-color: #e9e9e9;"| General Election, November 8, 1932

Wisconsin Circuit Court (1937)

| colspan="6" style="text-align:center;background-color: #e9e9e9;"| General Election, April 1937

Wisconsin Supreme Court (1941)

| colspan="6" style="text-align:center;background-color: #e9e9e9;"| General Election, April 1, 1941

See also

References

Politicians from Evansville, Indiana
Republican Party Wisconsin state senators
Republican Party members of the Wisconsin State Assembly
Wisconsin state court judges
Military personnel from Wisconsin
United States Army officers
United States Army personnel of World War I
University of Wisconsin–Madison alumni
Harvard Law School alumni
1892 births
1956 deaths
Burials in Wisconsin
20th-century American judges
20th-century American politicians